Issiaka Fofana (born 11 May 1982) is an Ivorian cyclist.

Major results

2006
 1st National Time Trial Championships
 3rd National Road Race Championships
2008
 1st Stage 7 Boucle du Coton
2009
 1st National Road Race Championships
2011
 1st National Road Race Championships
2012
 1st Overall Tour de Côte d'Ivoire
1st Stages 1 & 2
 3rd Overall Tour du Cameroun
2014
 4th Overall Tour du Cameroun
2016
 6th Overall Tour du Faso

References

1982 births
Living people
Ivorian male cyclists